Western Australia has extensive long-distance highways with few localities along them. Privately owned general stores known as roadhouses have been established at strategic points as an important utility for petrol, food, accommodation, emergency facilities and general supplies. They are also useful reference points in any response to accidents, floods, crime and other emergencies.

North-western roadhouses are found next to river crossings or close to station homesteads. In the event of flooding of the North West Coastal Highway, they are locations where vehicles including road trains can be safely encamped and accounted for when a sudden deluge may make the road impassable.

On the Nullarbor or Eyre Highway, places designated as roadhouses are in some cases also vested as localities and, in some cases, known as roadhouse communities.

The following list is of roadhouses that exist in isolation, having little or no adjacent community infrastructure.  It does not include roadhouses which are in country towns.

Roadhouses

 Auski (Munjina)
 Balladonia
 Billabong
 Caiguna
 Capricorn
 Cue 
 Cocklebiddy
 Doon Doon
 Eucla
 Fortescue River 
 Ilkurlka on the Anne Beadell Highway
 Kumarina Roadhouse
 Madura
 Minilya
 Mount Barnett
 Mundrabilla
 Murchison
 Nanutarra
 Overlander
 Pardoo
 Roebuck Plains Roadhouse
 Sandfire
 Tjukayirla on the Great Central Road
 Willare Bridge Roadhouse
 Wooramel

Driver fatigue
Due to the high incidence of fatalities and accidents attributed to driver fatigue, some locations have opted into a program of providing free coffee to encourage drivers to take a break or rest on long journeys - in some cases some of the roadhouses above have become involved in that programme.

See also
List of highways in Western Australia

References

Roadhouses in Western Australia
Lists of buildings and structures in Western Australia